Independence Day ( Yom Ha'atzmaut, lit. "Day of Independence") is the national day of Israel, commemorating the Israeli Declaration of Independence in 1948. The day is marked by official and unofficial ceremonies and observances.

Because Israel declared independence on 14 May 1948, which corresponded with the Hebrew date 5 Iyar in that year, Yom Ha'atzmaut was originally celebrated on that date. However, to avoid Sabbath desecration, it may be commemorated one or two days before or after the 5th of Iyar if it falls too close to the Jewish Sabbath. Yom Hazikaron, the Israeli Fallen Soldiers and Victims of Terrorism Remembrance Day is always scheduled for the day preceding Independence Day.

In the Hebrew calendar, days begin in the evening and Independence Day is observed from nightfall until the following evening of the designated day. The most recent occurrence of Yom Haatzmaut took place from sunset to sunset, 4-5 May 2022.

History 

Independence Day is founded on the declaration of the establishment of the State of Israel by the Jewish leadership headed by future Prime Minister David Ben-Gurion on 14 May 1948. The mood outside of Ben-Gurion's home just prior to the declaration was joyous: The Jews of Palestine ... were dancing because they were about to realize what was one of the most remarkable and inspiring achievements in human history: A people which had been exiled from its homeland two thousand years before, which had endured countless pogroms, expulsions, and persecutions, but which had refused to relinquish its identity—which had, on the contrary, substantially strengthened that identity; a people which only a few years before had been the victim of mankind’s largest single act of mass murder, killing a third of the world’s Jews, that people was returning home as sovereign citizens in their own independent state. Independence was declared eight hours before the end of the British Mandate of Palestine, which was due to finish on 15 May 1948.

The operative paragraph of the Declaration of the Establishment of State of Israel of 14 May 1948 expresses the declaration to be by virtue of our natural and historic right and on the basis of the resolution of the United Nations General Assembly. The operative paragraph concludes with the words of Ben-Gurion, where he thereby declares the establishment of a Jewish state in Eretz Israel, to be known as the State of Israel.

The new state was quickly recognized by the United States de facto, the Soviet Union, and many other countries, but not by the surrounding Arab states, which officially declared war on the new state, thus escalating the ongoing 1947–1948 civil war in Mandatory Palestine.

Events

Independence Day eve 
Memorial Day, or Yom Hazikaron, ends at sunset, and is immediately followed by the onset of Independence Day, given that in the Hebrew calendar system, days end and begin at sunset.
 
An official ceremony is held every year on Mount Herzl, Jerusalem on the evening of Independence Day. The ceremony includes a speech by the speaker of the Knesset (the Israeli Parliament), artistic performances, a Flag of Israel, forming elaborate structures (such as a Menorah, Magen David) and the ceremonial lighting of twelve torches, one for each of the Tribes of Israel. Every year a dozen Israeli citizens, who made a significant social contribution in a selected area, are invited to light the torches.
Many cities hold outdoor performances in cities' squares featuring leading Israeli singers and fireworks displays. Streets around the squares are closed to cars, allowing people to sing and dance in the streets.

Independence Day 

 Reception of the President of Israel for honouring excellence in 120 IDF soldiers. The event takes place in the President's official residence in Jerusalem.
 International Bible Contest in Jerusalem.
 Israel Prize ceremony in Jerusalem.
 Israel Defense Forces opens some of its bases to the public.
 Israeli Song Festival

From 1948 to 1973 the Israel Defense Forces parade was held on this day.

Israeli families traditionally celebrate with picnics and barbecues. Balconies are decorated with Israeli flags, and small flags are attached to car windows. Some leave the flags hoisted until after Yom Yerushalayim. Israeli Television channels air the official events live, and classic cult Israeli movies and skits are shown.

Religious customs 

In response to widespread public feeling, the Chief Rabbinate in Israel decided during 1950–51 that Independence Day should be given the status of a minor Jewish holiday on which Hallel be recited. Their decision that it be recited (without a blessing) gave rise to a bitter public dispute, with Agudath Israel rejecting the notion of imbuing the day with any religious significance whatsoever, and religious Zionists believing the blessing should be obligatory. The Rabbinate also ruled that they were "unable to sanction instrumental music and dances on this day which occurs during the sephirah period."  The recitation of the blessing over Hallel was introduced in 1973 by Israeli Chief Rabbi Shlomo Goren. The innovation was strongly denounced by his Sephardic counterpart, Rabbi Ovadia Yosef and by Rabbi Joseph B. Soloveitchik, leader of Modern Orthodox Judaism in America.

Other changes to the daily prayers include reciting Hallel, saying the expanded Pesukei D'Zimrah of Shabbat (the same practice that is observed almost universally on Hoshanah Rabbah), and/or blowing the Shofar. Rabbi Joseph Soloveitchik questioned the Halachic imperative in canonising these changes (it is not clear what his personal practice was regarding the recital of Hallel). In any case, the majority of his students recite Hallel without the blessings. A number of authorities have promoted the inclusion of a version of Al Hanisim (for the miracles...) in the Amidah prayer. In 2015 Koren Publishers Jerusalem published a machzor dedicated to observance of Independence Day, in addition to Jerusalem Day.

Most Haredim make no changes in their daily prayers. People affiliated to the Edah HaChareidis mourn the establishment of Israel on Independence Day, claiming that the establishment of a Jewish state before the coming of the Messiah is a sin and heresy. Some even fast on this day and recite prayers for fast days.

The Reform Movement suggests the inclusion of Ya'aleh V'yavo in the Amidah prayer.

In 2015, Rabbi Shlomo Riskin of Efrat founded Day to Praise, a global initiative which calls on Christians around the world to join in reciting the Hallel (Psalms 113–118), with the Jewish people, on Israel's Independence Day.

Timing 
Independence Day is designated to be on the 5th day of Iyar (ה' באייר) in the Hebrew calendar, the anniversary of the day on which Israeli independence was proclaimed, when David Ben-Gurion publicly read the Israeli Declaration of Independence. The corresponding Gregorian date was 14 May 1948.

However, nowadays Independence Day is rarely celebrated on the 5th of Iyar itself, and on most years is moved forward or backwards by one or two days. According to the rules of the Jewish calendar explained in Days of week on Hebrew calendar, the 5th of Iyar can fall on a Monday, a Wednesday, a Friday, or a Saturday. To avoid Sabbath desecration, it was decided in 1951 that if the 5th of Iyar falls on a Friday or Saturday, the celebrations would be moved up to the preceding Thursday (3 or 4 of Iyar). Additionally, since 2004, if the 5th of Iyar is on a Monday, the festival is postponed to Tuesday (6 of Iyar). Monday is avoided in order to avoid potential violation of Sabbath laws by preparing for Yom Hazikaron (which one day before Independence Day) on a Shabbat. As a result, Independence Day falls between 3 and 6 of Iyar, and can be on a Tuesday, Wednesday, or Thursday. It will only actually be on the 5th of Iyar when this date happens to be a Wednesday.

Upcoming Gregorian dates for Independence Day:

Israeli Arab reactions  
While some Israeli Arabs celebrate Yom Ha'atzmaut, others regard it as a tragic day in their history referred to as Nakba ("the catastrophe") As early as 1949, and officially since a 1998 proclamation by Yasser Arafat, May 15 was commemorated as Nakba Day.

References

External links 

 Independence Day Knesset
 Study Sheet for Yom HaAtzmaut: the Passover Hagada and Israel's Declaration of Independence
 Conservative Movement's Al HaNisim for Yom Haatzmaut
 Rabbi Eliezer Melamed, Peninei Halachah – Zmanim, Yom HaAtzmaut
 Adi Sherzer. Civil Religion, Israel Style: Independence Day Case Study, TLV1 Radio

Hallel
Israeli Declaration of Independence
Iyar observances
Independence days
Public holidays in Israel
Annual events in Israel